is a Japanese professional golfer.

Yasuda played on the Japan Golf Tour, winning six times. He also won several pre-tour events in Japan and on the Asia Golf Circuit. In 1968 he nearly won the Thailand Open but double-bogeyed the final hole giving Australian Randall Vines the win.

Professional wins (17)

Japan Golf Tour wins (6)

Japan Golf Tour playoff record (2–4)

Japanese circuit wins (7)
1968 Chunichi Crowns
1969 Kanto Open, Kanto Pro Championship
1970 Chunichi Crowns, Dunlop Tournament
1972 Golf Digest Tournament, Shizuoka Open

Asia Golf Circuit wins (4) 
1969 Philippine Open
1971 Singapore Open, Yomiuri International
1972 Taiwan Open

Team appearances
World Cup (representing Japan): 1969, 1970, 1971, 1980

References

External links

Japanese male golfers
Japan Golf Tour golfers
Sportspeople from Tokyo
1943 births
Living people